"" ("Very light music") is a song written and recorded by Italian singer-songwriters Colapesce and Dimartino. The song competed in the Sanremo Music Festival 2021, placing 4th in a field of 26. It also received the "Lucio Dalla" Press, Radio, TV, & Web Award.

Background
The song was written by Colapesce and Dimartino immediately after the release of their collaborative album , in June 2020. Its composition took a long time, since they struggled with finding the words to create a song full of meaning, but still light and simple.

In September 2020, they entered the studio and recorded the first demo of the song, working with producers Federico Nardelli and Giordano Colombo. After the song was chosen as one of the Sanremo Music Festival 2021 entries, they re-worked it with Adele Nigro, who recorded the song's background vocals, and violinist Davide Rossi. Following suggestions by the contest's artistic director Amadeus, the song's structure was also changed, removing an instrumental section.

Music video
The music video for the song was directed by Salvo "Zavvo" Nicolosi.

Charts

Weekly charts

Year-end charts

Certifications

Ana Mena version

Spanish singer Ana Mena recorded a Spanish-language version of the song, titled "", with lyrics adapted by Ana Mena herself, José Luis de la Peña Mira, Bruno Nicolas and David Augustave.
The song was produced by Dabruk, Federico Nardelli and Giordano Colombo, and it was released as a digital single on 25 November 2021 under Epic Records and Sony Music. On the following day, it was also released for airplay to radio stations in Italy and Spain.  

A music video for the song was released on 26 November 2021. It was directed by Willy Rodriguez and produced by The Panda Bear Show. The video is a tribute to female icons of the 1960s and 1970s. According to Ana Mena, she chose to record the song despite being used to a different sound, closer to contemporary influences, as she felt it as a tribute to the kind of music which emerged during the 1960s and first created a link between Italy and Spain. "It is an applause to Massiel, Mina, Cecilia etc. They opened the paths we walk now" Mena said.

Charts

Certifications

References

2021 songs
2021 singles
Sanremo Music Festival songs
Number-one singles in Italy
Ana Mena songs